The 2021 Stony Brook Seawolves football team represented the Stony Brook University as a member of the Colonial Athletic Association (CAA) in the 2021 NCAA Division I FCS football season. The Seawolves, led by 16th-year head coach Chuck Priore, played their home games at Kenneth P. LaValle Stadium.

Schedule

References

Stony Brook
Stony Brook Seawolves football seasons
Stony Brook Seawolves football